The 14th Texas Cavalry Regiment was a unit of mounted volunteers in the Confederate States Army that fought during the American Civil War. The regiment mustered as cavalry in the fall of 1861 but the soldiers were dismounted in March 1862 and served as infantry for the rest of the war. The regiment fought at the Siege of Corinth, and at Richmond, Ky., Stones River, and Chickamauga in 1862–1863. The unit fought in the Meridian and Atlanta campaigns and at Nashville in 1864, and at Spanish Fort and Fort Blakeley in 1865. The remaining 100 members of the regiment were paroled by Federal forces on 9 May 1865.

See also
List of Texas Civil War Confederate units

References

Units and formations of the Confederate States Army from Texas
1861 establishments in Texas
1865 disestablishments in Texas
Military units and formations disestablished in 1865
Military units and formations established in 1861